Mishi Khan is a Pakistani film and television actress and TV host. She is famous for starring as 'Uroosa' in PTV's Drama titled 'Aroosa' which was her debut serial. She then went on to star in numerous hit PTV dramas which have made her a household name. She also sing a song name Mahiya and worked with singer Ali Haider

Career
Mishi began her career with PTV hit drama 'Aroosa', she also starred in other PTV dramas such as Ajaib Khana, Boota from Toba Tek Singh, Tipu Sultan: The Tiger Lord and Andar Ki Baat. Over the years she has done Modeling, Singing, producing Dramas, Hosting and acting in films.

Films
 Nikah (1998)
 Janaan (2016)

Television

TV Host
 Kishmish (1998): on PTV World
 Sehar Mishi Khan Ke Saath (2012): on Kay2 Channel

References

External links

Pakistani television actresses
Living people
1971 births